The 1987–88 Yorkshire Cup was the 80th occasion on which the Yorkshire Cup competition was held. Bradford Northern won the trophy by beating Castleford by the score of 11-2 in a replay after drawing the first match 12-12
The initial match was played at Headingley, Leeds, now in West Yorkshire. The score was 12-12, the attendance was 10,947 and receipts were £40,283
The replay was at Elland Road,  Leeds. The score was 11-2, the attendance was 8,175 and receipts were £30,732
This was the fifth time in the incredible eleven-year period in which Castleford. previously only once winners in 1977, will make eight appearances in the Yorkshire Cup final, winning on four and ending as runner-up on four occasions. This season there were no junior/amateur clubs taking part, no new entrants and no "leavers" and so the total of entries remained the same at eighteen. This in turn resulted in the necessity to continue with a preliminary round to reduce the number of clubs entering the first round to sixteen.

Background 
The rugby Football League's Yorkshire Cup competition was a knock-out competition between (mainly professional) rugby league clubs from the county of Yorkshire. The actual area was at times increased to encompass other teams from outside the county such as Newcastle, Mansfield, Coventry, and even London (in the form of Acton & Willesden).
The Rugby League season always (until the onset of "Summer Rugby" in 1996) ran from around August-time through to around May-time and this competition always took place early in the season, in the Autumn, with the final taking place in (or just before) December (The only exception to this was when disruption of the fixture list was caused during, and immediately after, the two World Wars)

Competition and results

Preliminary round 
Involved 2 matches and 4 clubs

Round 1 
Involved 8 matches (with no byes) and 16 clubs

Round 2 - Quarter-finals 
Involved 4 matches and 8 clubs

Round 3 – Semi-finals 
Involved 2 matches and 4 clubs

Final

Final - Replay

Teams and scorers 

Scoring - Try = four points - Goal = two points - Drop goal = one point

The road to success 
The following chart excludes any preliminary round fixtures/results

Notes 
1 * This is the first Yorkshire Cup match to be played by Mansfield Marksman at their Lowmoor Road stadium in Kirkby-in-Ashfield (During the previous season they had played at Mansfield Town F.C.'s Field Mill ground but moved due to being unable to afford the rent on the low attendances they were attracting.
3 * Headingley, Leeds, is the home ground of Leeds RLFC with a capacity of 21,000. The record attendance was 40,175 for a league match between Leeds and Bradford Northern on 21 May 1947.
4 * Odsal is the home ground of Bradford Northern from 1890 to 2010 and the current capacity is in the region of 26,000, The ground is famous for hosting the largest attendance at an English sports ground when 102,569 (it was reported that over 120,000 actually attended as several areas of boundary fencing collapse under the sheer weight of numbers) attended the replay of the Challenge Cup final on 5 May 1954 to see Halifax v Warrington

See also 
1987–88 Rugby Football League season
Rugby league county cups

References

External links
Saints Heritage Society
1896–97 Northern Rugby Football Union season at wigan.rlfans.com 
Hull&Proud Fixtures & Results 1896/1897
Widnes Vikings - One team, one passion Season In Review - 1896-97
The Northern Union at warringtonwolves.org

RFL Yorkshire Cup
Yorkshire Cup